Where's Wally? The Great Picture Hunt! was released in May 2006. In the book Wally, Wizard Whitebeard, Wenda, Woof and Odlaw travel to fantasy worlds. The book is the sixth in the Where's Wally? series and the first in nine years.

Scenes
 Exhibit 1 – Odlaw's Picture Pandemonium
 Exhibit 2 – A Sporting Life
 Exhibit 3 – Brown Sailors And Green Scalers
 Exhibit 4 – Brown Sailors And Green Scalers Again
 Exhibit 5 – The Pink Paradise Party
 Exhibit 6 – Old Friends
 Exhibit 7 – Old Friends Again
 Exhibit 8 – A Monster Masterpiece
 Exhibit 9 – WallyWorld
 Exhibit 10 – WallyWorld Again
 Exhibit 11 – Pirate Panorama
 Exhibit 12 – The Great Portrait Exhibition

Notes

British picture books
Puzzle books
Where's Wally? books
2006 children's books
British children's books